The Headbangers are a professional wrestling tag team consisting of Mosh (Charles Warrington) and Thrasher (Glenn Ruth). As the name of the team implies, their gimmick is that they are a pair of metalheads, complete with heavy metal related T-shirts, kilts, piercings, goatees, shaved heads, and black face paint.

History

Beginning (1994–1996)
They were both trained by Larry Sharpe in New Jersey in the early 1990s. Warrington and Ruth teamed up in 1994 as the Spiders in their home state, New Jersey, for the National Wrestling Alliance. They made an Eastern Championship Wrestling appearance in June 1994, losing to The Bad Breed (Axl and Ian Rotten). Also they worked for United States Wrestling Association (USWA) feuding with the Rottens and The Eliminators. They had a brief stint in Dallas for the NWA in 1995. Later that year they moved down to Tennessee in Smoky Mountain Wrestling (SMW). It was there that they changed their gimmicks to the Headbangers. Their slogan was "Real men wear skirts." During their time in SMW, they feuded with The Rock 'n' Roll Express (Ricky Morton and Robert Gibson) and The Thugs (Tracy Smothers and Tony Anthony), and later sided with Jim Cornette and Terry Gordy in their feud with Brad Armstrong over the SMW Heavyweight Championship. By the end of the year, SMW folded and they returned to United States Wrestling Association. In December 1995, they debuted as jobbers in the WWF as the Spiders, the Arachnoids, and even used their real names. On an episode of Monday Night Raw they got a World Tag Team Title shot against the Smoking Gunns. Afterwards, they continued working for the USWA and the independent circuit.

World Wrestling Federation (1996–2000)

WWF Tag Team Champions
The team debuted on WWF television on the November 24, 1996 episode of Superstars under their Headbangers gimmick defeating Alex Porteau and 
Aldo Montoya. Shortly after that, they began wearing nuns' clothing and billed as the Flying Nuns (a play on the television show of the same name), Sister Angelica and Mother Smucker. They were also humorously billed as hailing from a monastery in the Himalayas. On an episode of Shotgun Saturday Night, Brother Love showed up to manage the Nuns. After the Nuns defeated The Godwinns, Love renamed them the Sisters of Love. The gimmick was short-lived, but they kept the skirts when they returned to being The Headbangers in January 1997. They later had T-shirts with the phrase "Real men wear skirts" and occasionally wore sports bras over their shirts. The duo often carried a boombox to the ring, and on one occasion, Mosh vomited during an interview.

Throughout 1997, The Headbangers (who were Tweeners), feuded with The Godwinns, as well as Doug Furnas and Phil Lafon, often finding themselves on the losing end. They faced The Legion of Doom during their surprise return match on February 24 to a double countout. At WrestleMania 13, The Headbangers won a four-way elimination match for a shot at the WWF Tag Team Championship. The team was seen on New York's WABC-TV in June, which re-aired on WWF programming.

The Headbangers won the vacant Tag Team title at Ground Zero: In Your House after Mosh pinned Owen Hart, thanks to run-in interference by Steve Austin. Mosh and Thrasher would lose the titles to the Godwinns at Badd Blood: In Your House in October. They faced The New Age Outlaws in their debut match as a team on October 20 and frequently challenged them into the following the year for the Tag Team title.

The two are seen backstage playing with Bret Hart's son, Blade, in the 1998 documentary film Hitman Hart: Wrestling with Shadows. The footage depicts events from the previous year.

Both Mosh and Thrasher entered the 1998 Royal Rumble and both lasted over 10 minutes before Mosh was eliminated by Kurrgan and Thrasher by Steve Austin. On February 17, 1998, The Headbangers won the NWA World Tag Team Championship from The Rock 'n' Roll Express, which aired on the February 23 edition of Raw Is War. They feuded with The Quebecers and the Oddities throughout the year and become the first Maryland Championship Wrestling Tag Team Champions on August 18 defeating Jimmy Cicero and Julio Sanchez in the finals of a tournament.

Split and reunion
The Headbangers were both meant to compete in the 1999 Royal Rumble, but Thrasher suffered a (legitimate) knee injury and was shelved while Mosh was (kayfabe) attacked backstage by Viscera as a way to write both men off television. While Thrasher was injured, Mosh would be repackaged as Beaver Cleavage and then Chaz, performed in singles competition and began having problems with his on-screen girlfriend, Marianna Komlos. He was kayfabe arrested on an episode of Sunday Night Heat in September after Komlos claimed he hit her. After Chaz's match on October 5, Glenn Ruth (Thrasher) showed GTV footage of Mariana applying makeup to create the effect of wounds. This proved her accusations false, and The Headbangers subsequently reunited. They then took on a gimmick where they dressed as the opponents that they feuded with, such as the Dudley Boyz and Mean Street Posse. The duo later turned heel and began to dress in drag, which included wearing breast cones.

Mosh entered in the 2000 Royal Rumble alone eliminated by Rikishi; however, The Headbangers continued performing in tag team and singles matches. Both men participated in the Hardcore battle royal at WrestleMania 2000 where Thrasher held the title for 43 seconds defeating Joey Abs. The team continued battling the likes of Too Cool and T & A until July 2000. After being together for six long years, they separated, and Mosh joined D'Lo Brown as Chaz to form Lo Down. Thrasher focused on his singles career and was taken off WWF TV and the main roster later that month.

Glenn Ruth was released from the WWF in December 2000, after working several months in their developmental territory Power Pro Wrestling in Memphis, and Charles Warrington was released from the WWF in August 2001.

Criticism by WWE
Years after their departure from the company, The Headbangers have borne the brunt of criticism by WWE media. One example can be found in a 2007 article in WWE Magazine about the history of WWE champions. The article criticized wrestlers who are considered not worthy of winning a belt they held. The Headbangers were included in this article for their supposedly poor Tag Team Championship reign. The article suggested that the team had the titles by default since it was "in between the eras of The Smoking Gunns and the New Age Outlaws."

WWE's Raw 15th Anniversary magazine also includes a list of 15 superstars who "overstayed" their welcomes in the company. This has The Headbangers at #2, behind only Scott Steiner. However, in 2010 WWE added the team to their "Where Are They Now?" section of WWE.com.

Independent circuit (2011–present)
Mosh and Thrasher reunited on the independent circuit in 2011. They are members of the NWA Ring Warriors roster. They wrestled for Juggalo Championship Wrestling multiple times. On August 12, 2011, The Headbangers were in the battle royal won by Zach Gowen. On December 17, 2011, The Headbangers defeated Necro Butcher and Mad Man Pondo. December 31, 2011, The Headbangers lost to Shockwave The Robot and 2 Tuff Tony. The Headbangers then lost two ten-man tag team matches while teaming with Bull Pain, Jake Manning and Colt Cabana.

Mosh and Thrasher appeared on the Ring of Honor pay-per-view Best in the World on June 24, 2012 as the masked tag team Guardians of Truth, managed by the Truth Martini. They lost to the Briscoe Brothers. Later on, the two would unmask themselves and go on to compete as The Headbangers. They then competed on the Independent Circuit. In March 2013, both Headbangers were present during a WWE Smackdown taping. On June 18, 2013, The Headbangers defeated The South Side Playaz Club (Craig Steele and Joe Hardway) at PWS Dream on 6th Anniversary iPPV.

The Headbangers made their debut for Championship Wrestling Entertainment (CWE) competing in a triple threat match at Wrestlefest 2015. In 2016 they made their debut for Fighting Evolution Wrestling. On March 31, 2017 they defeated Cryme Tyme at Fighting Evolution Wrestling in Orlando, Florida. Later that same year they went Australia to wrestle for World Series Wrestling and feuded with The Basso Brothers.

Return to WWE (2016)
The duo made their first appearance as a team in WWE since 2000 on the August 30, 2016 episode of SmackDown Live as heels and participants of the SmackDown Tag Team Championship tournament, losing against Heath Slater and Rhyno in the first round. They returned on the November 1 episode of SmackDown, losing to The Usos in a Survivor Series qualifying match. Then they were seen again on the November 15 900th episode of SmackDown, teaming with other heel tag teams.

Championships and accomplishments
Atomic Revolutionary Wrestling
ARW Tag Team Championship (1 time)
Coastal Championship Wrestling
CCW Tag Team Championship (1 time)
Fighting Evolution Wrestling
FEW Tag Team Championship (2 times, current)
Figure Wrestling Federation
FWF Tag Team Championship (1 time)
Heartland Wrestling Association
HWA Tag Team Championship (1 time)
Heroes And Legends Wrestling
 HLW Tag Team Championship (1 time, current)
Independent Professional Wrestling Alliance
IPWA Tag Team Championship (1 time)
Insane Championship Wrestling
ICW Streetfight Tag Team Championship (1 time)
Main Event Championship Wrestling
MECW Tag Team Championship (1 time)
Maryland Championship Wrestling
MCW Tag Team Championship (1 time)
National Wrestling Alliance
NWA World Tag Team Championship (1 time)
New England Wrestling Federation
NEWF Tag Team Championship (3 times)
Texas Wrestling Alliance
TWA Tag Team Championship (1 time)
World Wrestling Association
WWA Tag Team Championship (1 time)
World Wrestling Federation
WWF Hardcore Championship (1 time) – Thrasher
WWF Tag Team Championship (1 time)
Wrestling For Charity
WFC Tag Team Championship (1 time)

See also
 Cross-dressing

References

Cross-dressing
Independent promotions teams and stables
Smoky Mountain Wrestling teams and stables
United States Wrestling Association teams and stables
WWE teams and stables
WWE World Tag Team Champions